Edward Gibbon (1707–1770) was an 18th-century English MP: for Petersfield from 1734 to 1741; and Southampton from 1741 to 1747.

Gibbon was the only son of Edward Gibbon of Putney and his wife Catherine née Acton. He was educated at Westminster School and Emmanuel College, Cambridge;  after which he did the Grand Tour. On 3 June 1736 he married Judith née Porten: their son became the historian Edward Gibbon.  Judith died in December 1747; and on 8 April 1755 he married secondly Dorothea née Patten.

References

18th-century English people
Alumni of Emmanuel College, Cambridge
People educated at Westminster School, London
British MPs 1734–1741
1707 births
1770 deaths